Janequeo or Yanequén, was a lonco (chief) and heroine of the Mapuche-Pehuenche people. She was the wife of the lonco Huepotaén, chief of Llifén, who was killed after being tortured by order of Governor Alonso de Sotomayor. She succeeded him as lonco, in command of the struggle against the Spanish.

References

16th-century Mapuche people
Characters in La Araucana
Mapuche women
Native American women in warfare
People whose existence is disputed
People of the Arauco War
Women in 16th-century warfare